Mrs. Harris is a 2005 American-British made-for-television drama film written and directed by Phyllis Nagy. The teleplay, based on the book Very Much a Lady by Shana Alexander, focuses on the tempestuous relationship between Herman Tarnower, noted cardiologist and author of the New York Times bestseller The Complete Scarsdale Medical Diet, and headmistress Jean Harris. Produced by Killer Films, Number 9 Films, and John Wells for HBO Films, it premiered at the Toronto International Film Festival on September 16, 2005, before its broadcast on HBO on February 25, 2006.

The film stars Annette Bening as Jean Harris, Ben Kingsley as Herman Tarnower, Cloris Leachman as Tarnower's sister, and Chloë Sevigny as his secretary and lover. The film also features a cameo performance by Ellen Burstyn as one of Tarnower's previous girlfriends; Burstyn played Jean Harris in the made-for-television movie, The People vs. Jean Harris (1981).

Plot
On a stormy night in March 1980, a distraught Jean Harris arrives at the baronial Purchase, New York home of Herman Tarnower following a five-hour drive from McLean, Virginia. Her goal is to commit suicide beside the pond on his estate after confronting her former lover, who spurned her in favor of his considerably younger secretary-receptionist Lynne Tryforos.

When Jean removes a gun from her handbag, Tarnower attempts to take it away from her, and in the struggle he is accidentally shot and collapses. Because the phone isn't working, Jean drives off to seek help from a neighbor, only to return to the house when she sees a police car heading in that direction.

The film then follows divergent paths, using flashbacks and flashforwards to tell the story of the couple's initial meeting, their evolving and eventually faltering relationship, the night of the shooting, and Jean's consequent trial for murder. A divorced mother of two sons, she tends to be complacent in both her personal and professional lives, the ideal target for Herman, a vulgar man with the need to be in total control of everyone and everything. He proposes marriage and presents Jean with a ring she feels is embarrassingly large and overly gaudy for the headmistress of a private girls' school. As time passes, she presses him to set a wedding date, until he finally confesses he has changed his mind about marrying her, primarily because he has no interest in playing the role of father to her sons. Jean attempts to return the ring, but he insists she keep it, and, instead of allowing her to make a clean break from the relationship, he continues to manipulate her by taking advantage of her need for a dominant presence in her life. By prescribing numerous medications to which she becomes addicted, he forces her to become both physically and emotionally dependent upon him while he flaunts his many affairs with other women.

During Jean's trial, a flashback to the night of the shooting shows it in a very different light from the earlier portrayal. An angry Jean willfully and methodically shoots Herman and coldly watches him writhe in pain, but on the witness stand she insists it was an accident. Her staunch refusal to allow attorney Joel Aurnou to portray her former lover in a bad light prevents him from presenting any details that would support a defense of extreme emotional disturbance. Consequently, she is found guilty and sentenced to 15 years to life in the Bedford Hills Correctional Facility in Westchester County.

Cast

 Annette Bening as Jean Harris
 Ben Kingsley as Herman Tarnower
 Cloris Leachman as Pearl Schwartz
 Bill Smitrovich as Joel Arnou
 Chloë Sevigny as Lynne Tryforos
 Frances Fisher as Marge Jacobson
 Michael Gross as Leslie Jacobson
 Cristine Rose as Suzanne
 Mary McDonnell as Vivian Schulte
 Philip Baker Hall as Arthur Schulte
 Robert Cicchini as Det. Siciliano
 Michael Paul Chan as  Dr. Louis Roh
 Ellen Burstyn as Former Tarnower Steady
 Nan Martin as Mama Tarnower
 Lisa Edelstein as Forensic Psychologist
 Brett Butler as Tarnower Ex #1
 Lee Garlington as Tarnower Ex #2
 Jessica Tuck as Wife #1
 John Rubinstein as Tarnower's Best Friend
 Larry Drake as Harris Defense Team Psychiatrist
 Heidemarie Fuentes as Crying Court Room Spectator (uncredited)
 Michael C. Moore as Jimmie Harris

Production
Playwright and screenwriter Phyllis Nagy made her directorial debut on Mrs. Harris after executive producer Elizabeth Karlsen asked her who she thought should direct her screenplay. Nagy told Creative Screenwriting, "After I finished the first draft of that script, and Liz Karlsen brought me in to talk about directors, I knew she was going to ask me who I thought could direct this. I thought to myself, 'Well, I want to direct it.' But I didn’t say that. I came up with four names of people that I didn’t think would screw it up, and basically, she didn’t want any of them. And she said, 'Well, I think you should do it.' I thought, 'Oh! Yes, very smart woman, thank you.'"

This was the second television movie about the Harris murder trial, following The People vs. Jean Harris, which aired in 1981 shortly after the verdict was rendered. In the earlier film, Harris was portrayed by Ellen Burstyn, who makes a cameo appearance in Mrs. Harris as Gerda Stedman, one of Tarnower's many lovers. Her performance, which consists of two lines of dialogue totaling 38 words and lasts 14 seconds, was nominated for an Emmy Award for Outstanding Supporting Actress in a Miniseries or Movie. USA Today reported when asked about her reaction to the nomination by AP Radio, Burstyn responded, "I thought it was fabulous. My next ambition is to get nominated for seven seconds, and, ultimately, I want to be nominated for a picture in which I don't even appear."

Critical reception

On review aggregator Metacritic, Mrs. Harris received a weighted average score of 70/100 based on 21 critics, indicating "generally favorable reviews". Dennis Harvey of Variety called the film "competent rather than inspired" and an "uneven affair", adding that the film "doesn't seem sure just what approach to settle on: Elements of mystery, social satire (Nagy does have some bright lines up her sleeve), psychological horror story, black comedy, and straightforward tragic love story all jostle without complementing each other or achieving a successful kaleidoscope effect ... Nevertheless, tale and execution are both colorful enough to hold attention."

Awards and nominations

DVD release
HBO Home video released the film in anamorphic widescreen format on DVD on August 1, 2006. It was re-released in September 2012. It features audio tracks in English and Spanish and subtitles in English, Spanish, and French. Bonus features include commentary by Annette Bening, Ben Kingsley, and writer-director Phyllis Nagy, and Mrs. Harris For the Record: Firsthand Accounts, which includes brief interviews with some of the real-life principals involved in the story, including Jean Harris.

Notes

References

External links
 Official website (Archive)
  Mrs. Harris at BFI

2005 television films
2005 films
2005 crime drama films
American films based on actual events
Films set in the 1960s
Films set in the 1970s
Films set in the 1980s
Films produced by Elizabeth Karlsen
Films scored by Alex Wurman
Killer Films films
Number 9 Films films
HBO Films films
American crime drama films
American drama television films
2000s English-language films
2000s American films